This is a list of Pashto-language singers.

 Ahmad Zahir
 Aryana Sayeed
 Ali Baba Khan
 Haroon Bacha
 Irfan Khan
 Ustad Awalmir
 Bacha Zareen Jan
 Bakhtiar khattak  
 Mangal
 Farhad Darya
 G. M. Durrani
 Zeek Afridi
 Masood Akhtar
 Munir Sarhadi
 Hamayoon Khan
 Gulzar Alam
 Wahid Khan
 Beltoon
 Qamar Gula
 Gul Panra
 Nazia Iqbal
 Ubaidullah Jan 
 Ghazala Javed
 Khyal Muhammad
 Laila Khan
 Latif Nangarhari
 Naghma
 Rezwan Munawar
 Nashenas
 Raheem Shah
 Shafi Muhammad Shah
 Rafiq Shinwari
 Sardar Ali Takkar
 Shah Wali
 Gul Zaman
 Zarsanga
 Qamar Gula
 Nazia Iqbal
 Zeb Bangash
 Hidayatullah (singer)

Musical bands
 Ismail and Junaid (Peshawar KPK)
 Khumariyaan

See also

 List of Afghan singers

References

External links

Pashto
Pashto language singers
 
Pakistani singers